Petrovka is a rural locality (a selo) in Krasnoyarovsky Selsoviet of Mazanovsky District, Amur Oblast, Russia. The population was 119 as of 2018. There are 2 streets.

Geography 
Petrovka is located on the right bank of the Birma River, 32 km southwest of Novokiyevsky Uval (the district's administrative centre) by road. Antonovka is the nearest rural locality.

References 

Rural localities in Mazanovsky District